The 1986 RRC Fuji F2 Champions Race, was the sixth round of the 1986 Japanese Formula Two Championship. This race was held at the Fuji International Speedway, on 10 August.

Report

Entry
For this round, a total of 13 arrived at the Fuji Speedway for the race, which was the last Japanese F2 race at Fuji, before the series transferred to F3000 specification cars.

Race

Mike Thackwell took the winner spoils for the Team Nova, in their March 86J. Second place went to the Italian Ivan Capelli aboard the Leyton House Racing entered March-Yamaha 86J. The podium was completed by the local driver, Satoru Nakajima in the Heroes Racing’s March-Honda 86J.

Classification

Race Result

References

1986 in motorsport
Super Formula
RRC Fuji Champions Race